The 1999 WNBA season was the third season for the Phoenix Mercury. The Mercury failed to qualify for the postseason after advancing to the WNBA Finals during the previous year.

Offseason

WNBA Draft

Regular season

Season standings

Season schedule

Player stats

References

External links
Mercury on Basketball Reference

Phoenix Mercury seasons
Phoenix
Phoenix Mercury